Area code 406 is the telephone area code covering the entire state of Montana. It has been Montana's only area code since area codes were created in 1947.

As of 2013, there were 1.7 million lines served by 47 carriers; all but two wireline providers support local number portability (the exceptions are small rural independents Hot Springs Telephone Company and Northern Telephone Cooperative). Sufficient available codes for new exchanges in the 406 area code exist to meet anticipated demand until 2027; number pooling has been implemented in response to increased demand and inefficient use of 406 numbering resources.

Prior to October 2021, area code 406 had telephone numbers assigned for the central office code 988. In 2020, 988 was designated nationwide as a dialing code for the National Suicide Prevention Lifeline, which created a conflict for exchanges that permit seven-digit dialing. This area code was therefore scheduled to transition to ten-digit dialing by October 24, 2021.

Exchanges in area code 406
 Absarokee: 328, 985
 Alberton: 722
 Alta: 349
 Alzada: 828, 938
 Anaconda: 559, 560, 563, 691, 797
 Arlee: 726
 Ashland: 784, 983
 Augusta: 562
 Avon: 492
 Bainville: 769
 Baker: 778, 891, 956, 978
 Belfry: 664
 Belgrade: 388, 813, 924
 Belt: 277
 Bigfork: 420, 837
 Big Sandy: 378
 Big Sky: 993, 995, 999
 Big Timber: 930, 931, 932, 936
 Billings: 200, 206, 208, 237, 238, 245, 247, 248, 252, 254, 255, 256, 259, 272, 281, 294, 318, 325, 371, 373, 384, 435, 534, 545, 591, 598, 601, 606, 620, 647, 651, 652, 655, 656, 657, 661, 670, 671, 672, 690, 694, 696, 697, 698, 702, 794, 839, 850, 855, 860, 861, 867, 869, 876, 894, 896, 927, 969
 Birney: 984
 Bloomfield: 583
 Boulder: 225, 313
 Box Elder: 352
 Bozeman: 209, 219, 312, 404, 414, 451, 522, 539, 548, 551, 556, 570, 577, 579, 580, 581, 582, 585, 586, 587, 589, 595, 599, 600, 602, 624, 898, 916, 920, 922, 994
 Brady: 753
 Bridger: 662, 800
 Broadus: 436, 935
 Broadview: 667
 Brockton: 786
 Browning: 338, 573
 Busby: 592
 Butte: 221, 299, 310, 479, 490, 491, 494, 496, 497, 498, 533, 565, 593, 723, 782, 792
 Canyon Creek: 368
 Carlyle: 588
 Carter: 734
 Cascade: 468
 Charlo: 644
 Chester: 759
 Chinook: 357
 Choteau: 466
 Circle: 485, 974
 Clinton: 330, 825
 Clyde Park: 686
 Colstrip: 213, 720, 740, 748, 749
 Columbia Falls: 892, 897
 Columbus: 290, 298, 321, 322, 780
 Condon: 754
 Conrad: 271, 278, 289, 505, 576
 Cooke City: 838
 Crooked Creek: 484
 Culbertson: 514, 787, 790
 Custer: 856
 Cut Bank: 229, 391, 845, 873
 Dagmar: 483
 Darby: 821
 Decker: 757
 Deer Lodge: 415, 645, 846
 Denton: 567
 Devon: 432
 Dillon: 596, 660, 683, 865, 925, 960, 988
 Divide: 267, 553
 Dixon: 246
 Dodson: 383
 Drummond: 288
 Dupuyer: 472
 Dutton: 476
 East Conrad: 627
 East Glacier Park: 226
 Ekalaka: 775, 975
 Elmo: 631, 849
 Ennis: 682
 Ethridge: 339
 Eureka: 296
 Eureka rural: 297, 882, 889
 Fairfield: 467
 Fairview: 742, 747
 Fallon: 486
 Finley Point: 571, 887
 Flaxville: 474
 Flaxville rural: 779
 Forsyth: 201, 346, 351, 356, 729
 Fort Benton: 621, 622
 Fort Peck: 526
 Fort Shaw: 264
 Fort Smith: 666
 Frazer: 695
 Frenchtown: 508, 626
 Froid: 766
 Froid rural: 963
 Fromberg: 668
 Gallatin Gateway: 518, 763
 Gardiner: 848
 Geraldine: 737
 Geyser: 735
 Gildford: 376
 Glasgow: 228, 230, 263, 831, 942
 Glendive: 345, 359, 365, 377, 948, 987
 Glentana: 724
 Grant: 681
 Grass Range: 428, 928
 Great Falls: 205, 216, 217, 231, 268, 315, 403, 452, 453, 454, 455, 564, 590, 604, 727, 731, 750, 760, 761, 770, 771, 781, 788, 791, 799, 836, 866, 868, 870, 878, 899, 923, 952, 964, 965
 Hamilton: 360, 361, 363, 369, 375, 381, 802, 961
 Hardin: 623, 629, 638, 665, 679, 699, 953
 Harlem: 353
 Harlowton: 632
 Harrison: 685
 Haugan: 678
 Havre: 262, 265, 808, 879, 945
 Hays: 673
 Helena: 202, 204, 227, 324, 389, 410, 417, 422, 430, 431, 437, 438, 439, 440, 441, 442, 443, 444, 447, 449, 457, 458, 459, 461, 465, 475, 495, 502, 513, 555, 558, 594, 603, 634, 841, 933, 992, 996
 Highwood: 733
 Hingham: 397
 Hinsdale: 364
 Hobson: 423
 Hopp Illiad: 386
 Hot Springs: 741
 Hungry Horse: 387, 929
 Huntley: 348
 Hysham: 342
 Jackson: 834
 Joliet: 905, 962
 Joplin: 292
 Jordan: 557, 977
 Judith Gap: 473
 Kalispell: 212, 249, 250, 253, 257, 260, 261, 270, 300, 309, 314, 407, 471, 607, 751, 752, 755, 756, 758, 858, 871, 885, 890
 Kevin-Oilmont: 337
 Kremlin: 372
 Lakeside: 709, 844
 Lambert: 774, 914
 Lame Deer: 477
 Larslan: 725
 Laurel: 530, 628, 633, 743, 812
 Lavina: 636
 Lewistown: 350, 366, 380, 535, 538, 707, 708, 968
 Libby: 283, 291, 293, 334, 400
 Lima: 276, 340
 Lincoln: 362
 Lindsay: 584
 Livingston: 220, 222, 223, 224, 333, 823, 946
 Lodge Grass: 639
 Loma: 739
 Malta: 301, 654, 680
 Manhattan: 282, 284
 Marion: 854, 991
 Martinsdale: 572
 Medicine Lake: 789
 Melrose: 835
 Melstone: 358
 Melville: 537
 Miles City: 232, 233, 234, 851, 852, 853, 874, 934, 944, 951
 Missoula: 203, 207, 214, 215, 218, 239, 240, 241, 243, 251, 258, 273, 274, 303, 317, 327, 329, 370, 396, 493, 523, 529, 531, 532, 540, 541, 542, 543, 544, 546, 549, 550, 552, 721, 728, 829, 830, 880, 926
 Molt: 669
 Moore: 374
 Musselshell: 947
 Nashua: 746
 Neihart: 236
 North Broadus: 554
 North Cut Bank: 336
 North Frannie: 764
 North Glasgow: 367
 North Hinsdale: 648
 North Nashua: 785
 North Parkman: 643, 659
 North Poplar: 448
 North Havre: 394, 398
 North Ryegate: 575
 North Wolf Point: 392
 Noxon: 847
 Olney: 820, 881
 Opheim: 762
 Outlook: 895
 Ovando: 793
 Pablo: 275, 332, 675
 Peerless: 893
 Pendroy: 469
 Philipsburg: 859
 Plains: 826
 Plentywood: 765
 Plevna: 772, 971
 Polson: 319, 872, 883, 884
 Pompey's Pillar: 875
 Poplar: 768
 Potomac: 244
 Power: 463
 Rapelje: 663
 Raynesford: 738
 Red Lodge: 425, 426, 445, 446, 818
 Reed Point: 326
 Reserve: 286
 Richey: 773, 979
 Ridge: 767
 Rock Springs: 354
 Ronan: 528, 676, 833
 Rosebud: 347
 Roundup: 320, 323, 331, 913
 Roy: 464, 954
 Rudyard: 355
 Ryegate: 568
 Saco: 527
 Saint Ignatius: 744, 745, 824
 Saint Mary: 732
 Savage: 776
 Scobey: 487, 688
 Scobey rural: 783
 Seeley Lake: 210, 499, 677
 Shelby: 424, 434, 450, 460, 470, 597, 966
 Sheridan: 842
 Sidney: 433, 478, 480, 482, 488, 489, 630, 943, 973
 Silvertip: 574, 840
 Somers: 393, 857
 South Alberton: 864
 South Broadus: 427
 South Chester: 456
 South Miles City: 421, 981
 South Havre: 390, 395, 399
 South Malta: 658
 South Wolf Point: 525, 915
 Stanford: 566
 Stevensville: 625, 777
 Stockett: 736
 Saint Regis: 269, 280, 649
 Sunburst: 561, 937
 Superior: 382, 515, 822
 Swan Lake: 612, 886
 Sweetgrass: 335
 Terry: 635, 637, 957
 Thompson Falls: 242, 615, 827
 Three Forks: 285, 616
 Townsend: 266, 521, 949, 980
 Troy: 295
 Turner: 379
 Twin Bridges: 684
 Valier: 279
 Victor: 642
 Virginia City: 843
 Valley Industrial Park: 524
 Warm Springs: 693
 West Beach: 877
 Westby: 385
 West Camp Crook: 972
 West Glacier: 888
 West Glendive: 687, 939, 941, 989
 West Sidney: 798
 West Squaw Gap: 569
 West Yellowstone: 640, 641, 646
 Whitefish: 730, 862, 863
 Whitehall: 287
 Whitewater: 674
 White Sulphur Springs: 305, 547
 Wibaux: 795, 796
 Wilsall: 578
 Winifred: 462
 Winnett: 429
 Wisdom: 689
 Wise River: 832
 Wolf Creek: 235, 302
 Wolf Point: 650, 653
 Worden: 967
 Wyola: 343
 Yellow Bay: 692, 982
 Premium numbers: (1-406) 976

Use by Google
On December 10, 2008, Google's Gmail Blog announced that SMS messages could be sent from inside Gmail. The messages are sent from numbers in the 406 area code. Each number is unique and can be bookmarked for replies or future use.

Google also employs the use of area code 406 for the assignment of reply-to or callback numbers for Google Voice's customers' contacts.

References

See also

 List of exchanges from AreaCodeDownload.com, 406 Area Code

406
406
Telecommunications-related introductions in 1947